Megan Letter is an American YouTuber primarily known for her Roblox videos on her YouTube channel, MeganPlays. Prior to YouTube, Letter studied graphic design in college. In mid 2020, Letter and her husband Zach launched a game studio called Wonder Works and is currently the President of the studio. Letter also runs an online store, Stay Peachy.

Careers

YouTube 
In 2018, Letter was relatively unknown. At the time, she was making content on The Sims. After switching to Roblox after being unable to pay bills, she rapidly began gaining popularity under the stage name of "Megan Plays". As of April 2021, Letter was getting 40 million monthly views and had more than three million subscribers on her channel, MeganPlays. She is most known for making Adopt Me! videos.

Wonder Works 

In 2020, Letter and her husband "Zach," created a Roblox game studio called Wonder Works (also known as Wonder Works Studio). One of the reasons is because Letter wanted more control over her content. Wonder Works also chose Roblox over Steam because most of her online followers already have Roblox installed on their device. Their first release was Overlook Bay, where you can adopt a pet, build a house and explore the city. Overlook Bay has been played more than 160 million times. The studio has also released another game called Traitor.

See also 

 List of YouTubers
 Roblox
 Adopt Me!

References 

American YouTubers
Living people
YouTube channels launched in 2014
Year of birth missing (living people)
Roblox